Vladimir Alekseyevich Khodus (born 13 July 1952) is a Russian football manager and a former player. He is the assistant manager of Peresvet Domodedovo.

External links
 

1952 births
People from Petrovsky District, Stavropol Krai
Living people
Soviet footballers
FC Dynamo Stavropol players
FC Metalurh Zaporizhzhia players
FC Stal Kamianske players
FC Spartak Kostroma players
FC Torpedo Zaporizhzhia players
Soviet football managers
Russian football managers
FC Vorskla Poltava managers
Russian expatriate football managers
Expatriate football managers in Ukraine
Russian expatriate sportspeople in Ukraine
Expatriate football managers in Poland
Expatriate football managers in Lebanon
Expatriate football managers in Oman
SC Olkom Melitopol managers
FC Metalurh Zaporizhzhia managers
FC Znamya Truda Orekhovo-Zuyevo managers
Crimean Premier League managers
Association football midfielders
FC Kafa Feodosiya managers
Association football defenders
Sportspeople from Stavropol Krai
FC Dynamo Makhachkala players